David Lee Carden is an American lawyer, diplomat, mediator and author who is a former United States Representative to the Association of Southeast Asian Nations (“ASEAN”) with the rank of Ambassador Extraordinary and Plenipotentiary. He was nominated by President Barack Obama in November 2010 and confirmed by the U.S. Senate in March, 2011. He resigned his post in December 2013. Carden was a partner at Jones Day, an international law firm, where he was, at various times, the Partner in Charge of the firm's Asian offices and practices, the head of its International Securities practice, and the head of Litigation in its New York office.

Legal career
Carden began his legal career in the Chicago office of Kirkland & Ellis, where he was in the Litigation Department. While at Kirkland, Carden was a member of the team that represented Amoco in connection with the oil spill that resulted from the grounding of the Amoco Cadiz.

Carden was a partner in the Chicago law firm of Coffield Ungaretti, before joining the Chicago office of Jones Day in 1990. In 2000 Carden moved from Chicago to the firm’s New York office.  Carden led Jones Day’s New York Trial Practice department, which included its Intellectual Property and Labor practices. Carden later became Co-Chair of the Jones Day’s worldwide Securities Litigation and Enforcement Practice.

While at Jones Day, Carden was responsible for representing clients in some of the largest securities fraud cases ever litigated, including those concerning Enron, Parmalat and AIG. Carden defended cases concerning derivatives, collateralized debt obligations,  credit default swaps, currencies, commodities, options, various direct investments and more traditional financial products.

Carden also coordinated the defense of litigation brought in the courts of numerous foreign countries, including the United Kingdom, France, Switzerland, Luxembourg, the Netherlands Antilles, Thailand, Italy and Barbados, and defended and prosecuted claims and conducted investigations for and against entities in numerous countries, including Indonesia, Singapore, China, Saudi Arabia, Lebanon and Syria.

Carden was recognized by Chambers, New York Super Lawyers and The New York Times “Super Lawyer Section” for his accomplishments defending securities litigation. He also was listed as being one of Lawdragon’s “Lawyers You Need to Know in Securities Litigation”.

Mediation
Carden currently is serving as a mediator in commercial disputes in the United States and is on the board of the Weinstein International Foundation, a non-profit foundation that provides training and promotes the mediation of non-commercial, public interest disputes abroad.

Involvement with Indiana University
Carden currently is Ambassador-At-Large at Indiana University, where, among other responsibilities, he is Chairman of the Advisory Board for The Center for Rural Engagement.  According to the CRE’s website, the goal of the CRE is to improve the lives and opportunities of the citizens of Indiana “by working with partners to discover and deploy evidence-based, data informed and scalable solutions to common challenges facing rural communities.”

Involvement in politics
Carden has been a friend and golf partner of President Barack Obama’s for over twenty years and was an early supporter of his political career. He was an initial member of the National Finance Committee for the Obama 2008 Presidential Campaign. He and his wife, Rebecca Riley, were among the 2008 Campaign’s top bundlers, raising over $500,000.

Ambassadorship
As U.S. Ambassador, Carden oversaw the broadening engagement of the United States in Southeast Asia, which included the Obama Administration's 2011 "pivot" or "rebalance" to the region. Based in the U.S. Mission to ASEAN in Jakarta, he traveled throughout ASEAN's 10 member states and Asia. His responsibilities included supporting ASEAN as it moves toward economic integration in 2015 and advocating for the systemic changes necessary to promote peaceful and prosperous growth in the region.

Under his leadership, the U.S. Mission addressed the issues inherent in realizing ASEAN's aspirations, including economic development, trade liberalization, intellectual property protection, developing the rule of law and more effective governance, pandemic prevention and preparedness, providing more effective responses to natural disasters, advancing health care and educational opportunities, addressing human and wildlife trafficking, terrestrial and maritime environmental protection, managing the region's fisheries and natural resources, responding to deforestation and climate change, food and water security, advancing programs to increase the resilience of ASEAN's people and institutions, promoting historical and cultural preservation, and focusing on sustainable cities. He worked to build alliances in the region, including facilitating efforts by the embassies of countries in the European Union and Latin America in their engagement with ASEAN.

The U.S. Mission to ASEAN, which tripled in size during Carden's tenure, encouraged better decision making in both the ASEAN Member States and in the region. To this end, he hired the first ever science advisor to be posted in an American embassy or mission and advocated successfully for the creation of an ASEAN Fulbright Scholarship Program. The Mission also created an ASEAN-U.S. Science and Technology Fellows Program.

Honors and awards
In recognition of his efforts, Ambassador Carden was given the U.S. Department of State's Superior Honor Award. The Award was given in December 2013.  In May, 2014 he received the Thomas Hart Benton Mural Medallion from Indiana University in recognition of his relationship and contributions to the University and for his public service.

In 2016 and 2017, Ambassador Carden was in Residency at the Rockefeller Foundation’s Bellagio Center, where he was working on a book.

Speaking Engagements
Carden has maintained an active speaking schedule since his departure from his post as the Ambassador to ASEAN, including presentations at the Milken Global Conference and the Milken London Summit, the In House World Counsel Summit, the US Japan South East Asia Workshop, the ASEAN Business and Investment Summit and the CIFOR Forestry Conference, among others.

In 2012, Ambassador Carden gave the commencement addresses at Indiana University for students graduating from its graduate programs and the law school.

Books, Articles and Other Writings
Ambassador Carden is the author of Mapping ASEAN: Achieving Peace, Prosperity and Sustainability in Southeast Asia, Indiana University Press, 2019.

He also has authored articles on foreign and domestic policy, including the following: A Land for Peace Settlement in Ukraine: Is It Time to Think About It? The Fletcher Forum of World Affairs, 2022; Beyond Ceasefires: Using Private Mediators to Resolve Stalemated Civil Conflicts, Strategic Review, 2022; Putin's Wars on Rationality and Globalization, The Fletcher Forum of World Affairs, 2022; Domestic Policy Is Foreign Policy: Wage Stagnation and Income Inequality Threaten America's Leadership Abroad, The SAIS Review of International Affairs, 2022; We All Are Ukrainians, The SAIS Review of International Affairs, 2022; To Save Democracy, America Needs a Mandatory Public Service Program, Foreign Policy, 2021; Concepts of Ownership Shouldn’t Apply to the Parthenon Marbles, ekathimerini, 2021; Finding Common Ground: The Effect of Geography on Domestic and Foreign Policy, The SAIS Review of International Affairs, 2021; To Pay for the Pandemic, Dry Out the Tax Havens, Foreign Policy, 2020; My Solution to the Parthenon Marbles Row: a Museum for the 21st Century, The Guardian, 2020; From Climate Change to the Coronavirus, Complex Adaptive Systems Thinking is Key to Handling Crises, South China Morning Post, 2020; Why We Need a New Approach to North Korea, Politico, 2018; Why Asian Trade is a National-Security Issue (with Ambassador David I. Adelman), Politico, 2015; and Sustaining ASEAN’s Science and Technology Future, (with Dr. Montira Pongsiri), The Strategic Review, 2015

Board Memberships

Ambassador Carden is the Chairman of the Advisory Board for The Center for Rural Engagement at Indiana University.

He also is on the Board of the Weinstein International Foundation, a non-profit foundation that provides training and promotes the mediation of non-commercial, public interest disputes abroad.

Family and personal life
Carden was born in Indiana.  He graduated magna cum laude from DePauw University and from the Indiana University Maurer School of Law, where he was Order of the Coif.

Carden is married to Rebecca Riley, a former Vice President of the John D. and Catherine T. MacArthur Foundation.  In 1997, Riley arranged for Obama to speak in Chicago at a Valentine’s Day gathering of the “Futures Committee”, a civic leadership group created by the Local Initiatives Support Corp. The speech has been reported to have been “the speech that launched Obama.”

See also
Ambassadors of the United States

References

External links

Year of birth missing (living people)
Living people
Ambassadors of the United States to ASEAN
American expatriates in Indonesia
New York (state) lawyers
DePauw University alumni
Indiana University Maurer School of Law alumni
People associated with Kirkland & Ellis